Hugh Bowie Gilmour (November 1, 1861 – January 23, 1934) was a mechanical engineer and political figure in British Columbia. He represented Vancouver City in the Legislative Assembly of British Columbia from 1900 to 1903.

He was born in Toronto, the son of Robert Gilmour and Lizzie Bowie. In 1882, he married Alfreda Nester. He served on Vancouver City Council in 1899. In 1917, he was named as a commissioner on the first Workmen's Compensation Board of British Columbia; he served until his death in Vancouver at the age of 71.

Gilmore station on the SkyTrain system is located at Gilmore Avenue, which was named (misspelled) after Gilmour.

References 

1861 births
1934 deaths
Independent MLAs in British Columbia